Little Pendulum Island is an island in Eastern Greenland, in the Northeast Greenland National Park.

History
The island was named by Douglas Charles Clavering’s 1823 expedition, during which the Irish scientist Edward Sabine swung the pendulum on the largest of the islands (Sabine Island).

Geography
Little Pendulum Island is located to the north east of Wollaston Foreland, and to the south of Shannon Island. Together with Sabine Island (formerly Inner Pendulum Island) and an islet named Walrus Island south of Sabine, it constitutes the Pendulum Islands.

See also
List of islands of Greenland

References

Uninhabited islands of Greenland